Myurella bilineata is a species of sea snail, a marine gastropod mollusk in the family Terebridae, the auger snails.

Description
The length of the shell varies between 20 mm and 30 mm.

Distribution
This marine species occurs off the Philippines and Papua New Guinea

References

External links
 Sprague J.E. (2004) Four new species of Terebridae (Mollusca: Gastropoda) from the Philippine Islands. Beagle 20: 25-29
 Fedosov, A. E.; Malcolm, G.; Terryn, Y.; Gorson, J.; Modica, M. V.; Holford, M.; Puillandre, N. (2020). Phylogenetic classification of the family Terebridae (Neogastropoda: Conoidea). Journal of Molluscan Studies

Terebridae
Gastropods described in 2004